Hubert "Hugh" Charles Pond (22 February 1923 – 19 December 2014) was an officer in the British Army Parachute Regiment, who won the Military Cross during a daring attack on the Merville battery in Normandy on D-Day.

Pond was later mentioned in despatches for his service with the Commonwealth Division in Korea.

After leaving the Army, Pond became the military correspondent of the Daily Express and, in 1961 joined the Tupperware Company where he became a senior executive.

References

External links
Pegasusarchive.org
Express.co.uk

1923 births
2014 deaths
British Parachute Regiment officers
Recipients of the Military Cross
British journalists
People from Twickenham
British Army personnel of World War II
Royal Tank Regiment officers